The Baiga are an ethnic group found in central India primarily in the state of Madhya Pradesh, and in smaller numbers in the surrounding states of Uttar Pradesh, Chhattisgarh and Jharkhand. The largest number of Baiga is found in Baiga-chuk in Mandla district and Balaghat district of Madhya Pradesh. They have sub-castes: Bijhwar, Narotia, Bharotiya, Nahar, Rai maina and Kath maina. The name Baiga means "sorcerer-medicine man".

Demographics 

The Baiga are designated as a Scheduled tribe in much of Uttar Pradesh. The 2011 Census of India for that state showed those so classified as numbering 17,387. They are, however, designated as a Scheduled Tribe in Sonbhadra district.

Livelihood 
The Baiga do not plow the land, because they say it would be a sin to scratch the breast of their Mother, and they could never ask their Mother to produce food from the same patch of earth time and time again: she would have become weakened. The Baiga tribes practice shifting cultivation, called 'bewar' or 'dahiya'.

Live-in relationships are common among the Baiga. If marriage does take place, the man compensates the woman's family for the loss of a working member. This reverse dowry either involves footing the bill of the marriage celebration or offering the woman's family mahua liquor. If divorced, the new husband must compensate the old one for the dowry amount. If the divorced couple have children, the wife has the first right, followed by the husband. If neither wants to raise the child, the community will allot a guardian to the child until age 15.

The Baigas in Chhattisgarh are classified as Particularly vulnerable tribal group(PVTG) by Government due to their declining population and low level of literacy. The Government of India has notified 75 PVTG which reside in 18 states and one UT which are classified on the basis of five criteria and in Chhattisgarh Baigas along with Abhujmaria, Kamar, Pahadi Korwa and Birhor  are included in this group. The women of these tribes were not provided reproductive rights like right to use contraceptives but in 2018 on a Public Interest Litigation Chhattisgarh High Court allowed them to have access to contraceptives. The Baigas were found to be highly focused on family planning.

Culture

Language

It is believed that the ancestors of the Baigas spoke an Austroasiatic language, however no trace of it is left now. Some Baigas (specifically those from the Mandla district) have mentioned "Baigani" as their mother tongue in the past: Baigani is now recognised as a variety of Chhattisgarhi influenced by Gondi. Most Baigas speak Hindi, and some of them also know a few local languages such as Gondi and Marathi depending on the region where they live.

Cuisine
Baiga cuisine primarily consists of coarse grains, such as kodo millet and kutki, and involves very little flour. Another staple food of the baiga is pej, a drink that can be made from ground macca or from the water left from boiling rice. They supplement this diet with food from the forest, including many fruits and vegetables. They hunt, primarily fish and small mammals.

Forced evictions
Since the 1960s, the Baiga have been the victims of forced evictions at the hands of the Indian authorities. These are often carried out in the name of conservation, in an attempt to protect the tiger populations, but have disastrous consequences for the displaced communities.

Notes

Notable people
 Jodhaiya Bai Baiga, tribal artist

References

Journals

Bibliography

Further reading

External links

THE THREATENED TRIBAL:THE BAIGAS
http://www.tribalphoto.com/pages/tribes/india,madhya_pradesh_baiga.html
Photo essay on the Baiga tribe, Galli Magazine
Ideas of Life and Love from the Tribes of Chhattisgarh

Scheduled Castes of Uttar Pradesh
Social groups of Madhya Pradesh
Tribes of Jharkhand
Scheduled Tribes of Uttar Pradesh
Tribes of Chhattisgarh